The Three-Cornered Hat is a novel written by Pedro Antonio de Alarcón in 1874. The piece should be classified as a short story and it contains popular tradition with a linear plot line. The novel has a theatrical format and it has been compared with the Miguel de Cervantes novel Don Quijote.

It was adapted into the ballet The Three-Cornered Hat, by Manuel de Falla. 

The Three-Cornered Hat has been adapted into:
 A musical comedy by Howard Dietz and Arthur Schwartz called Revenge with Music (1934),\
 An opera composed by Riccardo Zandonai called La farsa amorosa (1933) 
 An opera composed by Hugo Wolf called Der Corregidor., A Musical Comedy version by Bob Beare and Young Smith was produced by Main Street Theatre in Houston in 2002.

References 

1874 novels
Spanish novels adapted into films
Novels by Pedro Antonio de Alarcón
Novels set in Andalusia
Novels adapted into ballets